The 2022 Portuguese motorcycle Grand Prix (officially known as the Grande Prémio Tissot de Portugal) was the fifth round of the 2022 Grand Prix motorcycle racing season. It was held at the Algarve International Circuit in Portimão on 24 April 2022.

Background

Riders' entries 
In the MotoGP class, the presence of Lorenzo Savadori as a wildcard with Aprilia Racing should be noted in the entry list of the race. In the Moto2 class, Keminth Kubo returns to ride the Yamaha VR46 Master Camp Team Kalex after missing the Grand Prix of the Americas after having issues with his visa. In the Moto3 class, in addition to the presence of Gerard Riu as a substitute for David Muñoz, David Salvador continues to replace John McPhee, absent due to injury, while Alberto Surra misses the Grand Prix due to a micro fracture of the scaphoid of his right hand during the previous stage and is replaced by Syarifuddin Azman. David Alonso also rides as a wild card, on the Aspar Team's Gas Gas.

MotoGP Championship standings before the race 
The victory at the Grand Prix of the Americas allows Enea Bastianini to take the lead in the riders' standings with 61 points, 5 more than Álex Rins, 11 more than Aleix Espargaró, 15 more than Joan Mir and 17 more than Fabio Quartararo. In the constructors' classification, Ducati confirms its leadership with 89 points, followed by KTM (59 points), Suzuki (57 points) which overtakes Aprilia (51 points), Yamaha (44 points) and Honda, which closes the list with 34 points. The team standings see Team Suzuki Ecstar firmly in the lead with 102 points, with Red Bull KTM Factory Racing and Aprilia Racing 32 and 33 points behind respectively. Gresini Racing MotoGP is fourth with 61 points and Pramac Racing is fifth at 59 points.

Moto2 Championship standings before the race 
Celestino Vietti, despite retiring in the previous race, remains at the top of the riders' standings with 70 points, followed by Ai Ogura (56 points), Tony Arbolino (winner in Austin) with 54 points, Arón Canet at 49 points and Somkiat Chantra at 45 points. The constructors' classification sees Kalex with full points with 100 points, Boscoscuro with 11 points and MV Agusta with 5 points. The top five positions of the team standings are occupied by Idemitsu Honda Team Asia (101 points), Elf Marc VDS Racing Team (89 points), Flexbox HP40 (72 points), Mooney VR46 Racing Team (70 points) and GasGas Aspar Team (54 points).

Moto3 Championship standings before the race 
Dennis Foggia returns to lead the riders' standings with 74 points, plus 16 from Sergio García. Andrea Migno is third on 41 points, followed by Izan Guevara and Deniz Öncü, both on 37 points. The constructors' classification sees Honda in the lead 90 points, plus 16 on Gas Gas, plus 28 on KTM, plus 50 on Husqvarna and CF Moto. In the team classification, Leopard Racing overtakes Gas Gas Aspar Team (97 points vs 95 points) in the lead. CFMoto Racing Prüstel GP is third at 58 points, with Red Bull KTM Ajo and Red Bull KTM Tech3 at 8 and 14 points behind respectively.

Qualifying

MotoGP

Moto2

Moto3

Race

MotoGP

 Raúl Fernández suffered a hand injury in a crash during qualifying and was declared unfit to compete.

Moto2
The race, scheduled to be run for 23 laps, was red-flagged after 8 full laps due to a multi-rider incident involving a total of eleven riders amid bad weather conditions. The race was later restarted over 7 laps with the starting grid determined by the classification of the first part. As a result of the incident, all crashed riders (including Marcos Ramírez, who crashed before the red flag came out) were not eligible to join the restart.

Moto3

Championship standings after the race
Below are the standings for the top five riders, constructors, and teams after the round.

MotoGP

Riders' Championship standings

Constructors' Championship standings

Teams' Championship standings

Moto2

Riders' Championship standings

Constructors' Championship standings

Teams' Championship standings

Moto3

Riders' Championship standings

Constructors' Championship standings

Teams' Championship standings

References

External links 

2022 MotoGP race reports
motorcycle Grand Prix
2022
motorcycle Grand Prix